The Intercollegiate Rowing Association (IRA) governs intercollegiate rowing between varsity men's heavyweight, men's lightweight, and women's lightweight rowing programs across the United States, while the NCAA fulfills this role for women's open weight rowing. It is the direct successor to the Rowing Association of American Colleges, the first collegiate athletic organization in the United States, which operated from 1870–1894.

The IRA was founded by Cornell, Columbia, and Penn in 1894 and its first annual regatta was hosted on June 24, 1895. Today Navy and Syracuse are also part of the association. Each year these five schools choose whom to invite to the IRA National Championship Regatta and are responsible for its organization.

The IRA runs the IRA National Championship Regatta, which is considered to be the United States collegiate national championship of men's rowing. This regatta includes both men's and women's (lightweight) events for sweep boats of all sizes.

The IRA National Championship is the oldest college rowing championship in the United States.

History

Columbia, Cornell and Pennsylvania were the organizing stewards of the Poughkeepsie Regatta, the IRA Championship until 1949. The first edition was held on the Hudson River at Poughkeepsie, New York, on June 24, 1895.

The format through 1967 with the exception of 1964 was to line all the entries in the race onto stake-boats and fire a shotgun for the start. In the last race of this format in 1967 on Onondaga Lake, in Syracuse, New York, 16 varsity crews waited for the gun to begin their three-mile race—winner take all.

The format was changed in the Olympic year, 1968, to heats and finals over a 2,000-meter, six-lane course. This heat-rep-final, six-lane, 2,000 meter format continues today. The regatta was cancelled in 2020 due to the COVID-19 pandemic. In 2021 a time trial will be added before the heats because of the difficulty of seeding during the pandemic. No spectators will be allowed for the 2021 regatta.

Since the 1920s, when the West Coast crews—notably California and Washington—began to attend and regularly win, most crews considered the Intercollegiate Rowing Association's championship (known as the IRA) to be a de facto national championship. Two important crews, Harvard and Yale, however, did not participate in the heavyweight divisions of the event. (After losing to Cornell in 1897, Harvard and Yale chose to avoid the IRA, so as not to diminish the Harvard–Yale Regatta. It soon became part of each school's tradition not to go). And beginning in 1973, Washington decided to skip the IRA because of change in schedule conflicted with its finals. Washington, however, returned to the regatta in 1995. In 2003, after an absence of over one hundred years, Harvard and Yale decided to participate. The Harvard Freshman eight competed at the 1970 IRA Regatta, finishing seventh in the Freshman event.

Champions

Varsity Openweight Eights
Men

 * Not held in 1933 due to the Depression. However, the first college 2000-meter national championship ever held was conducted by local businessmen in Long Beach, California, as a substitute. Washington raced both Harvard and Yale for the first time at this event and defeated Yale by eight lengths to win the championship. Washington counts this victory among its string of Men’s National Varsity Eight Championships.

† Navy was disqualified from the IRA Regatta for use of an ineligible coxswain. Trophies won by Navy were forfeited and not awarded. Cornell finished second.Number of Intercollegiate Rowing Association Championships: Varsity Openweight Eights

1 Cornell University (25 championships)

2 University of Washington (19 championships)

3 University of California - Berkeley (18 championships)

4 US Naval Academy (12 championships)

5 University of Pennsylvania (12 championships)

6 University of Wisconsin - Madison (12 championships)

7 Brown University (7 championships)

8 Syracuse University (6 championships)

9 Columbia University (4 championships)

10 Princeton University (3 championships)

10 Harvard University (3 championships)

10 Yale University (3 championships)

13 Northeastern University (2 championships)

14 Dartmouth College (1 championship)

Ten Eyck Trophy

The Ten Eyck Trophy is awarded to the school amassing the most overall points in a system based on the finishing places of three eights crews. From 1952 through 1973, the winning team was the one with the most points in the varsity, junior varsity and freshman eights. Starting in 1974, all races counted in the scoring under a system adopted by the coaches of the Eastern Association of Rowing Colleges. More recently, the scoring system was revised to include only three of the four possible eights from each school in the points standings.

See also
For collegiate rowing champions (U.S.), see: Intercollegiate sports team champions#Rowing
For IRA "men's varsity heavyweight eights" champions (1895–present), see: Intercollegiate sports team champions#Varsity Openweight Eights
For IRA "men's varsity lightweight eights" champions (1988–present), see: Intercollegiate sports team champions#Varsity Lightweight Eights
For IRA "men's overall points" champions (1952–present), see: Intercollegiate sports team champions#Overall Points
For IRA "women's varsity lightweight eights" champions (1997–present), see: Intercollegiate sports team champions#Varsity Lightweight Eights
For IRA "men's varsity lightweight fours" champions (2011–present), see: Intercollegiate sports team champions#Lightweight Fours.2FPairs
For IRA "women's varsity lightweight fours" champions (2007–present), see: Intercollegiate sports team champions#Lightweight Fours.2FPairs

References

External links

IRA coverage on row2k
 Regatta coverage on RegattaCentral

Camden County, New Jersey
College rowing in the United States
College sports championships in the United States
College sports governing bodies in the United States
College sports in New Jersey
Rowing governing bodies
Rowing competitions
Rowing